The 1959 Five Nations Championship was the thirtieth series of the rugby union Five Nations Championship. Including the previous incarnations as the Home Nations and Five Nations, this was the sixty-fifth series of the northern hemisphere rugby union championship. Ten matches were played between 10 January and 18 April. It was contested by England, France, Ireland, Scotland and Wales. France won the title outright for the first time, after two shared wins in 1954 and 1955.

Participants
The teams involved were:

Table

Results

External links

The official RBS Six Nations Site

Six Nations Championship seasons
Five Nations
Five Nations
Five Nations
Five Nations
Five Nations
Five Nations
Five Nations
Five Nations
Five Nations
Five Nations